Boar's Head Grill & Tavern is a restaurant and bar in Savannah, Georgia, United States. Located on the Lincoln Street ramp, at River Street, the restaurant, established in 1959, occupies the first floor of the Lower Stoddard Range former King Cotton warehouse dating to 1858. It is the oldest restaurant on River Street.

The restaurant's owner/chef is Philip Branan. He and his wife also owned Kevin Barry's Irish Pub, further west on River Street, until its closure in 2020.

References

External links
Boar's Head Grill & Tavern official website

Restaurants in Savannah, Georgia
Taverns in Georgia (U.S. state)
1959 establishments in Georgia (U.S. state)
Savannah Historic District